Rhipidomys ipukensis, also known as the Ipuca climbing rat, is a species of rodent in the family Cricetidae. It is found in the state Tocantins of Brazil.

References

ipukensis
Mammals of Brazil
Mammals described in 2011